This is a list of Rice Owls football players in the NFL Draft.

Key

Selections

See also
List of Rice University people

References

Lists of National Football League draftees by college football team
NFL
Texas sports-related lists
Houston-related lists